The henna-capped foliage-gleaner or chestnut-capped foliage-gleaner (Clibanornis rectirostris) is a species of bird in the family Furnariidae. It is found in Brazil and northern Paraguay. Its natural habitat is subtropical or tropical moist lowland forests.

References

henna-capped foliage-gleaner
Birds of Brazil
henna-capped foliage-gleaner
Taxonomy articles created by Polbot